Ashwanth Thilak is an Indian television actor, who has appeared in Tamil language films and television serials.

Career
The son of dance choreographer Seenu, Ashwanth Thilak studies for a career in hotel management before entering the film industry. Ashwanth Thilak began his career as an actor by appearing in T. K. Bose's romantic drama Kodaikanal (2008) alongside Poorna. The film had a low key opening at the box office and won Thilak mixed reviews about his performance. While a critic from KollywoodToday.com wrote he gives a "matured performance" and that "he emotes straight from his shoulders with no flaw", while a reviewer from ThaIndia.com stated Thilak "worsens the proceedings with a listless performance". Thilak then worked on Mani Ratnam's epic adventure film Raavanan, portraying Velan, the fiancé of the character portrayed by Priyamani. Featuring in an ensemble cast with Vikram, Prithviraj and Aishwarya Rai, Raavanan won critical and commercial acclaim upon release.

He also went on to feature in the shelved Neengatha Ninaivugal and in Muthuramalincoln's Snehavin Kadhalarkal (2014) as one of the four lead actors opposite Krithi Shetty (Advaitha). Furthermore, Thilak has made further film appearances in Climax (2013) and Nayagi (2016). Apart from films, Thilak has moved on to work in television serials, notably appearing in Vamsam.

He played one of the leads in the serials Nenjam Marappathillai and Bharya. He played a supporting role in the television serial Run.

Filmography

Television

Films

References

Living people
Male actors in Tamil cinema
21st-century Indian male actors
Male actors from Chennai
Tamil male television actors
1987 births